John Braspennincx (24 April 1914 – 7 January 2008) was a Dutch racing cyclist. He rode in the 1937 Tour de France.

References

External links
 

1914 births
2008 deaths
Dutch male cyclists
Place of birth missing